Berquin may refer to:
 places
 Neuf-Berquin, a French commune in Nord departement
 Vieux-Berquin, a French commune in Nord departement

 people
 Arnaud Berquin (1747–1791), a French children's author
 Louis de Berquin (c. 1490–1529), a French lawyer, civil servant, linguist and reformer